The Marine Safety Act 2003 (c 16) is an Act of the Parliament of the United Kingdom.

Section 2 - Fire authorities: power to charge
This section was repealed for England on 1 October 2004 and for Wales on 10 November 2004.

Section 4 - Commencement
Section 4 provided that the Act came into force at the end of the period of two months that began on the date on which it was passed. The word "months" means calendar months. The day (that is to say, 10 July 2003) on which the Act was passed (that is to say, received royal assent) is included in the period of two months. This means that the Act came into force on 10 September 2003.

References
Halsbury's Statutes,

External links
The Marine Safety Act 2003, as amended from the National Archives.
The Marine Safety Act 2003, as originally enacted from the National Archives.
Explanatory notes to the Marine Safety Act 2003.

United Kingdom Acts of Parliament 2003